International relations between Argentina and Israel, have existed for decades. Both countries established diplomatic relations on May 31, 1949.

History

Relations between the two were tied during the early years of Nazi hunting when Israel's Mossad kidnapped former Nazi Adolf Eichmann despite Argentine protestations of a violation of its sovereignty. Immediately after World War II, Argentina was a safe haven for former Nazi officials because they brought badly needed capital investment and/or technical expertise.

According to declassified British Foreign and Commonwealth Office documents, Israel sold arms to Argentina before and during the Falklands War. The arms sales to Argentina included Douglas A-4 Skyhawk jets which would later be used in the war with the United Kingdom.

Carlos Menem was the first head of state of Argentina to make a diplomatic visit to Israel, in 1991. He proposed to mediate between Israel and Syria in their negotiations over the Golan Heights. However, the relations were further tested when Hezbollah was blamed for bombing the Israeli embassy and a Jewish community centre in 1992 and 1994, respectively. Since 2013, roughly 100 Jewish organizations across Argentina have called for the government to repeal its pact with the Islamic Republic of Iran over the AMIA terrorist attacks.
 
In 2012, Argentine President Cristina Fernández de Kirchner met an Israeli-Palestinian delegation and announced that Argentina would spearhead the Latin American role in reinvigorating the peace process in the Israeli–Palestinian conflict. In 2010, Argentina announced the intention to join Brazil in recognizing an independent Palestinian state, provoking sharp criticism from Israel.

While Argentina has the largest Jewish population in Latin America, there have been various cases of anti-Semitism in Argentina, such as the desecration of 58 Jewish graves in La Tablada by unknown peoples in 2009, mostly due to negative stereotypes of Jews controlling business interests and dominating the world through capitalism, as well as Israel's affiliation with the United States.

In September 2017, Israeli Prime Minister Benjamin Netanyahu paid an official visit to Argentina, becoming the first Israeli Prime Minister in office to visit Argentina and Latin America.

In March 2019, two Iranian citizens used fake Israeli passports to leave Spain and different fake Israeli passports to enter Argentina. Realizing that the passports were fraudulent, Argentinian police arrested the suspects. Argentinian prosecutors discovered that the suspects had previously used fake passports to enter other countries, including Portugal.

In January 2020, President Alberto Fernández traveled to Israel for his first presidential trip abroad. There he paid respects to the victims of the Holocaust and maintained a bilateral meeting with Prime Minister Benjamin Netanyahu who thanked him for keeping Hezbollah branded as a terrorist organization, a measure taken by former President Mauricio Macri.

Resident diplomatic missions

 Argentina has an embassy in Tel Aviv.
 Israel has an embassy in Buenos Aires and honorary consulates in Córdoba and Mendoza.

See also
 Argentine Jews in Israel
 History of the Jews in Argentina
 International recognition of Israel
 Andinia Plan

References

External links
  Argentine Ministry of Foreign Relations: list of bilateral treaties with Israel (in Spanish only)
  Israeli embassy in Buenos Aires

 
Israel
Bilateral relations of Israel